Piotr Kraśko (born 11 July 1971, Warsaw) is a Polish journalist, theatrologist and television presenter. Between 1991–2016, he worked for the Telewizja Polska and since 2016 for the TVN channel.

Life and career
He graduated from the Klementyna Hoffmanowa High School No. 9 in Warsaw. He subsequently graduated in theatre studies from the  National Academy of Dramatic Art in Warsaw. During his studies he worked for the academic weekly Auditorium. Before the collapse of communism he was the host of a children's programme 5-10-15 broadcast on TVP1 channel. He also hosted the Na żywo as well as Oblicza mediów TV programmes. He worked as a TVP correspondent in Brussels (2003), Rome (2004–2005) and Washington (2005–2008). In the years 2011–2013, he hosted the Na pierwszym planie TV program. Between 2012–2016 he served as the head of the Wiadomości news programme. He frequently covered John Paul II's visits to Poland and travelled to various places around the world to provide live coverage of such events as the 2004 Indian Ocean earthquake and tsunami, 2005 London bombings, 2010 Smolensk air disaster, 2011 Tōhoku earthquake and tsunami as well as the 2014 Euromaidan.

Since 2016, he has been working for the TVN Group. Between 2016–2020 he hosted the Fakty o świecie program on TVN24 BiS and co-hosted the Dzień Dobry TVN morning show broadcast on TVN. In 2020, he was appointed head of the Fakty TVN, the flagship newscast of TVN channel.

He was the recipient of the Wiktor Award for Best Television Presenter in 2008 and 2013.

Personal life
He is the son of film producer Barbara Pietkiewicz and journalist Tadeusz Kraśko. He was married to Dominika Czwartosz (2000–2004). In 2008 he married Karolina Ferenstein with whom he has got sons Konstanty (b. 2007) and Aleksander (b. 2009) and daughter Lara (b. 2016).

Selected publications
 Dyskretny urok wystąpień publicznych, czyli Jak zmienić koszmar w radość (with Tomasz Kammel and Robert Krool), Warsaw 2002, 
 Kiedy świat się zatrzymał. 63 dni w Watykanie z Piotrem Kraśko, Katowice 2005, 
 Rok reportera, Katowice 2009, 
 Smoleńsk – 10 kwietnia 2010, Warsaw 2010, 
 Alaska – Świat według reportera, Warsaw 2011, 
 Świat w pigułce, czyli Teksas jest większy od Francji, Warsaw 2011, 
 Rwanda – W stanie wojny, Warsaw 2012, 
 Irak – W stanie wojny, Warsaw 2012, 
 Bejrut – W stanie wojny, Warsaw 2012, 
 Wielka Brytania – Świat według reportera, Warsaw 2012, 
 Francja – Świat według reportera, Warsaw 2012,

See also
Media in Poland

References

Living people
1971 births
Journalists from Warsaw
Polish television presenters
Aleksander Zelwerowicz National Academy of Dramatic Art in Warsaw alumni